The 2020 Barbados Premier League is the 75th season of the Barbados Premier League, the top division football competition in Barbados. The season began on 1 February 2020. The season was suspended on 17 March 2020 due to the COVID-19 pandemic.

Teams

Table

References 

Barbados Premier Division seasons
Barbados
Barbados
1
1
Barbados